The Men's giant slalom competition of the Calgary 1988 Olympics was held at Nakiska.

The defending world champion was Pirmin Zurbriggen of Switzerland, who was also the defending World Cup giant slalom champion, while Alberto Tomba was leader of the 1988 World Cup.

Results

References 

Men's giant slalom
Winter Olympics